A general election was held in the U.S. state of New Mexico on November 8, 2016. In the presidential election, voters in the state chose five electors to represent them in the Electoral College via popular vote. All three New Mexico seats to the United States House of Representatives were up for election. A special election was held for Secretary of State, along with all seats in both houses of the New Mexico Legislature. Primary elections were held on June 7.

Federal elections

U.S. President

U.S. House of Representatives 

All three incumbents were reelected: Democrat Michelle Lujan Grisham of the 1st district, Republican Steve Pearce of the 2nd district, and Democrat Ben Ray Luján of the 3rd district.

State elections

Secretary of State (special) 

On October 22, 2015, incumbent Secretary of State Dianna Duran resigned amid a corruption and campaign law investigation. Democrat Maggie Toulouse Oliver, who ran against Duran in 2014, defeated Republican Nora Espinoza  to fill the remainder of her term.

Republican primary 
Republican Brad Winter, who was appointed by Governor Susana Martinez following Duran's resignation, chose not to run for a full term. Because of this, state representative Nora Espinoza ran unopposed in the primary election.

Democratic primary 
Bernalillo County clerk Maggie Toulouse Oliver was the only Democrat to declare her candidacy, and ran unopposed in the primary election.

General election

New Mexico Legislature 
All seats of the New Mexico Legislature were up for election in 2016. The New Mexico Senate has 42 members elected to four-year terms, while the New Mexico House of Representatives has 70 members elected to two-year terms.

Senate

House of Representatives

Democrats strengthened their control of the Senate and regained control of the House, securing both legislative chambers.

Ballot measures

Constitutional Amendment 1 
The New Mexico Denial of Bail Measure is a constitutional amendment that allows courts to deny bail to a defendant charged with a felony, but only if the defendant is deemed a threat to the public. It was designed to retain the right to pretrial release for non-dangerous defendants.

References 

 
New Mexico